PTSD is the third studio album by American rapper G Herbo. It was released on February 28, 2020, by Machine Entertainment Group and Epic Records, and was originally digitally marketed and distributed by The Orchard (subsidiary of Sony Music). The production on the album was handled by multiple producers including C-Sick, D.A Damon, Don Cannon, TM88 and DJ Victoriouz, among others. It features guest appearances from fellow rappers 2Pretty,  21 Savage, A Boogie wit da Hoodie, BJ the Chicago Kid, Chance the Rapper, Jacquees, Juice Wrld, Lil Durk, Lil Uzi Vert, Polo G and Sonta.

PTSD was preceded by two singles: "In This Bitch" and "Shooter". The album received positive reviews from music critics and debuted at number seven on the US Billboard 200, earning 59,000 album-equivalent units in its first week. It was certified gold by Recording Industry Association of America (RIAA) in March 2021. The deluxe edition of the album was released on May 29, 2020, where it features guest appearances from Lil Durk and Lil Uzi Vert again.

Background
G Herbo said the album was inspired by therapy he took related to his upbringing and misdeeds. He said that he was pushed to go to therapy after being arrested in 2018. He said "When the lawyer told me to go see the therapist, it was really just me embracing it." He said he also wanted the album to raise awareness on the mental issues many people raised in high-crime neighborhoods go through, saying, "I thought it was important for me because I know it's a lot of people who are like me."

Singles
The album was supported by two singles. The first single, "In This Bitch" was released on February 14, 2020. The music video was released online on March 9, 2020. The second single, "Shooter" was released on February 21, 2020, only a few days before the album's release. The single also features a guest appearance by Jacquees.

Other songs
The title track, "PTSD", featuring Juice Wrld, Chance the Rapper, and Lil Uzi Vert became G Herbo's first ever song to chart on the US Billboard Hot 100, peaking at number 38 on the chart, as well as number 19 on US Hot R&B/Hip-Hop Songs, and number 15 on US Hot Rap Songs. On May 7, 2020, the song was certified gold by the Recording Industry Association of America (RIAA). The track "Glass In the Face", featuring A Boogie Wit da Hoodie additionally became his first ever song on the Bubbling Under Hot 100 chart, peaking at number 17.

Touring
On December 4, 2019, G Herbo announced the PTSD Tour, which would occur from February 10 to March 22, 2020. He later postponed a show in Denver, Colorado due to fears over the COVID-19 pandemic.

Critical reception

Fred Thomas of AllMusic stated that "Chicago's G Herbo evolved from solid mixtapes to being a superstar of the rap subgenre drill. Herbo's intense lyrics of personal trauma and struggles fit perfectly within drill's foreboding instrumental framework, and his fourth studio album, PTSD, finds the rapper moving into his most polished material without losing any energy." In addition, Thomas also praised the title track, stating that: "The album's title track is its catchiest moment and also one of its darkest. Lil Uzi Vert, Chance the Rapper, and Juice Wrld, Herbo delivers lyrics of mental health issues, paranoia, and anger in the form of a mesmerizing melodic hook." Alphonse Pierre of Pitchfork rated the album 7.3/10, saying "PTSD stays true to Herb's core: first-hand tales of living with trauma and paranoia and failing to overcome that trauma and paranoia with drugs and success."

Commercial performance
PTSD debuted at number seven on the US Billboard 200, earning 59,000 album-equivalent units, (including 4,000 copies as pure album sales) in its first week. This became G Herbo's first US top ten debut on the chart. The album also debuted at four on the US Top R&B/Hip-Hop Albums and number three on the US Top Rap Albums charts, respectively. On March 25, 2021, the album was certified gold by Recording Industry Association of America (RIAA) for combined sales and album-equivalent units of over 500,000 units in the United States.

Track listing
Credits adapted from Tidal and BMI.

Notes
  signifies an uncredited co-producer

Charts

Weekly charts

Year-end charts

Certifications

References

2020 albums
G Herbo albums
Albums produced by C-Sick
Albums produced by D. A. Doman
Albums produced by Don Cannon
Epic Records albums